Gejia Town is a rural town in Liuyang City, Hunan Province, People's Republic of China. It is surrounded by the towns of Dongyang and Jiangbei on the north, Beisheng Town on the northwest, Chengchong Town on the southwest, Zhentou Town on the west, Jili Subdistrict on the east, and Puji Town on the south.

History
In June 2016, Gejia was upgraded to a town.

Administrative division
The township is divided into five villages, the following areas: 
 Xinjian Village
 Gejiayuan Village
 Jinyuan Village
 Yutan Village
 Xinhong Village

Geography
Liuyang River, also known as the mother river, flows through the town.

Economy
The town's main industries are agriculture and fireworks.

Education
 Gejia Middle School

Transportation

Provincial Highway
Provincial Highway S103 passes across the town west to east.

County Roads
The town is connected to two county roads: X014 and X016.

Attractions
The Former Residence of Song Renqiong is a well-known scenic spot.

Celebrity
Song Renqiong (1909–2005), politician.

References

Divisions of Liuyang
Liuyang